Sport Comércio e Salgueiros, commonly known as simply Salgueiros, is a Portuguese multi-sports club from the city of Porto, in the northern region of the country.

Founded on 8 December 1911, in the parish of Paranhos, it is mostly known for its football team. It plays in the Porto Football Association Elite Division, which is the fourth tier of Portuguese football. Although they are based in Paranhos, they currently play their home matches at neighbor parish of Campanhã at the Complexo Desportivo de Campanhã which can accommodate 1,000 spectators.

History

Foundation
In 1911, a group of friends (João da Silva Almeida, Aníbal Jacinto and Antenor) decided to fund a football club after watching a game that opposed FC Porto and S.L. Benfica at the Campo da Rainha. The friends would gather after work and dinner at lamp 1047 between the streets of Constituição and Particular de Salgueiros to debate ideas and build their new club. Thus was formed Sport Grupo e Salgueiros.

The club had no money at the time, so the three founders decided to gather money by singing Christmas songs from door to door during the 1911 Christmas season. They collected a total of 2800 reis, which was enough to purchase their first football. They decided their jerseys should be red like Benfica's as a way to separate themselves from city rivals FC Porto. Their first pitch would be at the Arca D'Água, and the team's first matches were against Sport Progresso, Carvalhido Football Club, and others.

In the 1916–17 season, the team name was changed to Sport Porto e Salgueiros as a matter of local pride (and maybe also for its similarity with Sport Lisboa e Benfica). However, in 1920, after a profound economical crisis, Sport Porto e Salgueiros decided to join forces with another local club named Sport Comércio. This resulted in the name change of Sport Comércio e Salgueiros.

Golden years
From the 1930s, when the national leagues commenced, to the 1970s, Sport Comércio e Salgueiros was a mainstay of the Second Division, with the occasional participation in the First Division. That trend changed in the beginning of the 80's, with team being able to maintain respectable placings and playing for several consecutive years in the top tier. The highlight was a 5th place in the 1990–91 season that enabled the club to participate in European competitions for the first (and so far only) time. In the 1991–92 UEFA Cup, Salgueiros played Cannes in the first round and lost on penalties. Among the players in the French team was Zinedine Zidane. Salgueiros last participation in the first division was in the 2001–02 season.

Decline and resurgence
In 2004–05, facing perhaps its biggest economical crisis since its foundation, the senior football team was administratively relegated from the second division to the third-tier league. Due to the financial crisis, all the players in that season were non-professional, mostly upgraded players from the junior team. The club had also recently lost its emblematic stadium, (Estádio Engenheiro Vidal Pinheiro), which had been sold to the city hall in order to build a subway station at its location, and had no home arena in which to play their matches or to practice. Due to the dramatic financial situation and debts, with the club prevented from registering professional players, the senior team ceased to exist at end of the season.

After three years dormant, a Salgueiros team made its comeback to senior football as a new club named Sport Clube Salgueiros 08 for the 2008–09 season. However, the youth teams remained using the Sport Comércio e Salgueiros name. Starting with a senior football team, the new club soon expanded to futsal and handball teams, also creating female sections for football and handball. In their first season in the district leagues in 2008–09, the football team averaged home attendances of over 2,200 people per game, the 15th highest average attendance nationally, proving that support for the charismatic club was as strong as ever. They started in the Porto FA Second Division (the 7th tier of Portuguese football), coming first in their series and gaining access to the final which decided promotion to the Porto FA First Division. They managed to win the final and gain access to the First Division. Three more promotions in four seasons led Salgueiros from the regional leagues to the Campeonato Nacional de Seniores (now Campeonato de Portugal), the third-tier of Portuguese football, for the 2013–14 season. At the end of the 2014–15 season, the club changed its name to Sport Club Salgueiros.

On 8 December 2015, the club announced it had regained the rights of the original Sport Comércio e Salgueiros and would return to its former name and symbols at the start of the 2016–17 season.

Crest

Honours

National competitions
 Segunda Divisão
 Winners: 1956–57, 1989–90

Regional competitions
 Porto FA Championship/First Division
 Winners: 1917–18, 1949–50

Porto FA Second Division	
 Winners: 1921–22, 2008–09

 Porto FA Cup
 Winners: 1976–77, 1979–80

European competitions history

Recent seasons

Current squad

Other sports
Known mostly for its football section, the club has excelled at several other sports, such as water polo, handball and athletics. Despite the fact that Salgueiros doesn't have a swimming pool, the water polo team, coached by Nuno Mariani, won its 12th national title in a row in 2006. After being runner-up in the 2007 championship Salgueiros renewed the national title in 2008.

Notable players
Played more than 50 league games, or gained national notability elsewhere

References

External links
Official Facebook page 

 
Sports clubs established in 1911
Football clubs in Portugal
Football clubs in Porto
Association football clubs established in 1911
1911 establishments in Portugal
Primeira Liga clubs
Liga Portugal 2 clubs